Aaron Stuart Bell (born 25 February 1980) is a British Conservative Party politician who was elected as the Member of Parliament (MP)  for Newcastle-under-Lyme in the 2019 general election.

Early life
Bell was born in Dulwich, south east London, to parents Stuart and Janet Bell. He was educated at St Olave's Grammar School in Greater London, and in America at Episcopal High School in Alexandria, Virginia. He then studied at St John's College, Oxford, where he read PPE. Bell graduated with a BA in 2001.

Before his political career, Bell was a successful quizzer: he was part of the St John's College, Oxford team that were runners up in the 2000-01 series of University Challenge; he won the Krypton Factor in 2009; he was part of the Epicureans team that won Only Connect in 2010; he also won £25,000 on Deal or No Deal.

Bell worked as a trading development manager from 2003 to 2006, being employed by Ladbrokes. He was a senior trading performance analyst from 2006 to 2019 for the online betting company Bet365, and co-founded DivideBuy, a financial technology firm which employs 40 staff in Newcastle.

Political career 
Bell joined the Conservative Party in 2012, and took part in canvassing for the 2015 election. He stood in the Labour-held seat of Don Valley in South Yorkshire at the 2017 election, but was unsuccessful, despite turning the seat into a marginal. He was selected as the Conservative candidate for Newcastle-under-Lyme on 24 September 2019. The seat was one of the closest results at the 2017 election, with the Conservatives losing by only 30 votes.

He entered Parliament in December 2019, following the 2019 general election, in which he received 52.5% of the vote, an increase in the Conservative share of 4.4%, and a margin of 7,446 over the Labour candidate, Carl Greatbatch.

As of 21 January 2020, he has been an unpaid member of the board of Town Deal Newcastle-under-Lyme.

Bell has benefitted from hospitality worth thousands of pounds, provided on behalf of the gambling industry. He is a member of the All Party Parliamentary Group on Gambling, has spoken out against tougher regulation of gambling and criticised measures taken by the gambling industry regulator to reduce addiction.

In November 2021, he was one of 13 Conservative MPs who voted against a government-supported amendment to defer the suspension of Conservative MP Owen Paterson who was found to have breached lobbying rules.

In January 2022, in the wake of the Partygate controversy, Bell publicly criticised Boris Johnson by asking: "Does the Prime Minister think I'm a fool" for properly following COVID-19 regulations during his grandmother's funeral the year before.

Personal life 
Bell lives in Newcastle-under-Lyme  with his wife Emily, whom he married in 2008. They have three children.

Bell declared a shareholding valued at more than £70,000, on 9 January 2020, in Rematch Credit Ltd., the parent company of interest-free credit provider DivideBuy, in the Register of Members' Financial Interests.

Bell is non-religious and was elected Vice Chair of the All-Party Parliamentary Humanist Group, a group of humanist MPs and peers, in 2021. He became the secretary in 2022.

References

External links

1980 births
English atheists
English humanists
Living people
UK MPs 2019–present
Conservative Party (UK) MPs for English constituencies
Alumni of St John's College, Oxford
People educated at St Olave's Grammar School
Members of the Parliament of the United Kingdom for Newcastle-under-Lyme
Contestants on University Challenge